Joseph Henry Lewis "Harry" Turley (24 April 1859 – 5 June 1929) was an English-born Australian politician. He was a Member of the Queensland Legislative Assembly and an Australian Senator.

Early life 
Harry Turley was born in Gloucestershire on 24 April 1859. He was educated in England, after which he became a sailor. Having migrated to Australia in 1887, he became a waterside worker in Brisbane, and was President of the Wharf Laborers' Union.

Politics

In 1893, Harry Turley was elected to the Legislative Assembly of Queensland as the Labor member for South Brisbane, serving as Home Secretary in Anderson Dawson's short-lived Labor Government in 1899. In 1902 he left the Assembly, and in 1903 was elected to the Australian Senate as a Labor Senator for Queensland.

On 1 July 1910, he was appointed President of the Senate, a position he held until 8 July 1913. He remained a Senator until his defeat in 1917.

Later life
After leaving politics, Turley became a shipping master with the Queensland Harbours and Rivers Department. Turley died in 1929 and was buried in South Brisbane Cemetery.

References

External links

Australian Labor Party members of the Parliament of Australia
Members of the Australian Senate for Queensland
Members of the Australian Senate
Australian waterside workers
1859 births
1929 deaths
Burials in South Brisbane Cemetery
20th-century Australian politicians
English emigrants to colonial Australia